Mai El Kamash (born 10 September 1994) is an Egyptian former professional tennis player.

El Kamash has reached career-high rankings of 913 in singles and 876 in doubles by the Women's Tennis Association (WTA). She won one doubles title on tournaments of the ITF Women's Circuit.

Playing for the Egypt Fed Cup team, El Kamash has a win-loss record of 6–6.

ITF Circuit finals

Doubles (1–2)

Fed Cup participation

Singles

Doubles

References

External links
 
 
 
 Ole Miss Rebels profile

1994 births
Living people
Egyptian female tennis players
Sportspeople from Cairo
Ole Miss Rebels women's tennis players